Pacific Avenue station, is an at-grade light rail station on the A Line of the Los Angeles Metro Rail system. The station is located in the median of Pacific Avenue, after which the station is named, between West 4th Street and West 5th Street, in the city of Long Beach, California. The station is located on a loop at the south end of the A Line route and only has northbound service.

Service

Station layout

Hours and frequency

Connections 
, the following connections are available:
Torrance Transit: 3, Rapid 3

References 

A Line (Los Angeles Metro) stations
Transportation in Long Beach, California
Railway stations in the United States opened in 1990
1990 establishments in California